Balmoral (aka Liberty Hall) is a 1987 farcical play by British playwright Michael Frayn.

References

Plays by Michael Frayn
1987 plays
Plays set in Scotland
Methuen Publishing books